Januaria Constantino Keller (March 3, 1917 – December 11, 1991), better known by her stage name Carmen Rosales and by her nickname Mameng, was a noted Filipina actress and World War II guerilla fighter.

Her acting career spanned the decades immediately before, during, and after World War II. Her tremendous commercial success and wide fan base before the war led to her being considered the original superstar of Philippine movies. Her stage name, Carmen Rosales, was taken from her hometown of Carmen, Rosales, Philippines.

Early life
Januaria Constantino Keller was born in Plaridel, Bulacan Insular Government of the Philippine Islands of the US to Pantaleón Keller Rosales, her father who was Half Swedish
and Filipina mother, Pilar Constantino y de la Cruz, who was born April 13, 1872, in Quingua, Bulacan.

She was first married to Ramon Navales who was killed in the Second World War. She was remarried to Jose “Peping” Puyat from the wealthy Puyat Clan with whom she has one child named Cesar Rosales Puyat.

Acting career
She began her career in the radio and was proclaimed Queen of Radio in 1936.

Rosales' film debut was in Mahiwagang Binibini (1938) for Diwata Pictures, based on the zarzuela play of Atang dela Rama titled Ang Kiri.It was followed by Arimunding-Munding (1939) in her first leading role opposite Jose Padilla Jr for Excelsior Films before her contract was rescinded. When her friend brought her to Quisumbing, he rejected the young woman for not having the bearing of an actress.

Nonetheless, Rosales became one of the most famous Filipina actresses in the 1940s and 1950s, rivalling Rosa del Rosario at the box-office. She is famous for her sweet voice and numerous recordings.

It was Sampaguita Pictures that signed her up in 1939. Rosales was paired with Rogelio dela Rosa in Takip Silim released during the Christmas season of 1939, and of which started their loveteam. They made a total of 12 films under Sampaguita Pictures. After the World War II, she starred in Gerilyera (1946) with Celso Baltazar. Gerilyera was followed by Kaaway ng Bayan (1947) with Leopoldo Salcedo, which made Rosales the most sought-after actress of Philippine Movies. Afterward, she chose to be a freelancer.
 
In 1949, she became the Philippines' highest-paid movie star when LVN Pictures offered her the unprecedented sum of P45,000 to team up again with Rogelio dela Rosa in Kampanang Ginto, followed by Camelia, then Sipag at Yaman with Jose Padilla, Jr. and Batalyon Trece with Jaime dela Rosa. Among her unforgettable roles included the spurned lover of Rogelio dela Rosa in Maalaala Mo Kaya (1954) and a club-singer in Ang Tangi Kong Pag-ibig (1955).

She received her first FAMAS Award in 1954 for her role in Inspirasyon opposite Van de Leon. She was similarly awarded in 1960 for playing a strict matron in Estela Mondragon.

She garnered fame playing a hacendera in Pablo Gomez's version of MN (1954). Her last public appearance was in Inday Badiday's Eye to Eye.

World War II guerrilla activities 
Rosales' husband Ramon was killed by Japanese forces early in the Japanese Occupation of the Philippines during World War II. As a result, she decided to join a guerrilla group and fight the Japanese. She joined the Hukbong Bayan Laban sa Hapon forces, and became a sharpshooter. She was known for wearing a false mustache during guerrilla raids, in an effort to disguise herself.

The original "queen of Philippine movies"
Arguably, she was the "queen of Philippine movies" in the 1940s pinoy tambayan. The films in which she was top-billed aided in the popularity of emerging actresses like Gloria Romero, Amalia Fuentes and Susan Roces, who all became movie queens themselves decades later.

Death 
She died on December 11, 1991, of kidney malfunction  in Mandaluyong, Philippines. She is interred at the Loyola Memorial Park in Marikina.

Legacy
A barrio in Rosales, Pangasinan was named after her. It is now currently divided into two barangays, Carmen East and Carmen West.

Filmography
1939 - Mahiwagang Binibini
1939 -Arimunding-Arimunding
1939 - Takip-Silim
1940 - Senorita
1940 - Lambingan
1940 - Diwa ng Awit
1940 - Colegiala
1941 - Carmen
1941 - Princesita
1941 - Panambitan
1941 - Tampuhan
1941 - Palikero
1941 - Lolita
1944 - Liwayway ng Kalayaan
1946 - Probinsiyana
1946 - Guerilyera
1947 - Kaaway ng Bayan
1947 - Si, Si...Senorito
1947 - Mameng...Iniibig Kita
1947 - Ang Kamay ng Diyos
1947 - Hele-hele bago Quiere
1947 - 24 na Pag-ibig
1948 - Ang Selosa
1948 - Hindi Kita Malimot
1949 - Kampanang Ginto
1949 - Carmencita Mia
1949 - Simpatika
1949 - Camelia
1949 - Sipag ay Yaman
1949 - Batalyon XIII
1950 - Ang Bombero
1950 - Ang Magpapawid
1951 - Nanay ko
1951 - Anak ko
1951 - Babae...Babae at Babae Pa
1951 - Huling Concierto
1951 - Walang Kapantay
1953 - Rosa Villa
1953 - May Umaga Pang Darating
1953 - Inspirasyon (FAMAS Best Actress)
1954 - Maala-Ala Mo Kaya?
1954 - Matandang Dalaga
1954 - MN
1954 - Luha ng Birhen
1955 - Ang Tangi kong Pag-ibig
1955 - Uhaw na Pag-ibig
1955 - R.O.T.C.
1955 - Iyung-Iyo
1956 - Lydia
1959 - Sandra
1959 - Pitong Pagsisisi
1959 - Debutante
1959 - Baby Face
1959 - Vicky
1959 - Esmeralda
1960 - Estela Mondragon
1960 - Kaming Makasalanan
1960 - Tatlong Magdalena
1960 - Limang Misteryo ng Krus
1961 - Mother Dearest
1961 - Octavia
1961 - Halik sa Lupa
1961 - Dayukdok
1962 - The Big Broadcast
1962 - Mama's Boy
1962 - Sugat sa Balikat
1963 - Sosayting Dukha
1963 - The Big Show
1964 - Binibiro Lamang Kita
1964 - Anak ni Kamagong
1964 - The Dolly Sisters
1965 - Gintong Recuerdo
1965 - Apat na Kagandahan

References

External links
 

1917 births
1991 deaths
Filipino film actresses
Actresses from Pangasinan
Filipino people of American descent
Filipino people of Swedish descent
20th-century Filipino actresses
Ilocano people